The Nigora is an American breed of small or medium-sized dual-purpose goat, raised both for its milk and for its fiber. It is the result of cross-breeding Nigerian Dwarf bucks with does of mohair breeds such as the Angora.

History 

The Nigora is of recent creation: breeding started in 1994. A breed association, the American Nigora Goat Breeders Association, was formed in 2007. Another association, the Nigora Goat Breeders Society, was active in 2014.

Fiber 

As with the Pygora breed, the fiber is classified into three types, A, B and C, depending on the length and type of the fibers. Type A is Angora-type mohair, long and lustrous; type B is "cashgora", which combines mohair with cashmere-type undercoat and is of medium length; type C is like cashmere and is shorter.

References

Further reading

Cheryl Kimball (2009). The Field Guide to Goats. Voyageur Press. 

Goat breeds
Fiber-producing goat breeds
Goat breeds originating in the United States